Stormont was an electoral riding in Ontario, Canada. It was created in 1867 at the time of confederation and was abolished in 1973 before the 1975 election. The riding roughly corresponded to the territory of Stormont County.

Boundaries
From 1867 to 1886, the town of Cornwall was served by the separate electoral district of Cornwall; in 1886, the districts were merged, and the combined district was named Cornwall and Stormont only in the 1886 election. Its name reverted to Stormont for the 1890 election, and was not changed again until the riding's dissolution in 1975.

In the electoral redistribution of 1975, Stormont was split between the new ridings of Cornwall and Stormont—Dundas and Glengarry.

Members of Provincial Parliament

References

Former provincial electoral districts of Ontario